Uranotaenia sapphirina is a species of mosquito in the family Culicidae. Uranotaenia sapphirina is a common species throughout Eastern North America. It was found from an experiment that unlike Uranotaenia lowii which feeds only on anurans (frogs and toads), Uranotaenia sapphirina exclusively fed on annelid hosts such as earthworm and leeches.

References

Uranotaenia
Articles created by Qbugbot
Insects described in 1868